Fuller House is an historic house in the Adams Morgan neighborhood of Washington, D.C.  It has been listed on the District of Columbia Inventory of Historic Sites since 1985 and it was listed on the National Register of Historic Places in 1985.  The house was designed by architect Thomas J.D. Fuller and completed in 1893.  It is a contributing property in the Kalorama Triangle Historic District.

References

Adams Morgan
Arts and Crafts architecture in the United States
Houses completed in 1893
Houses on the National Register of Historic Places in Washington, D.C.
Individually listed contributing properties to historic districts on the National Register in Washington, D.C.